Bak Seo-saeng (?-?) was a Korean civil minister (munsin) in the 15th century during the early period of the Korean Joseon Dynasty (1392–1897). Bak was also diplomat and ambassador, representing Joseon interests in the Tongsinsa to the Ashikaga shogunate in Japan.

Biography
The birth and death dates of Bak Seo-saeng are unknown. However, he is of the Bian (Uiseong) Bak clan, and his grandfather is Bak Yun-bo and his father is Bak Jeom with the title of Jungnyangjang (a military post).

He learned confucianism from Gil Jae, one of the great neo-Confucianism scholar of Korea. In 1401, he passed gwageo, the state examination, with a low grade. In 1407, he passed high grade examination and served for the government as the Jeongeon (정언, 正言), and became Byeongjo Jwarang, the next year. In 1419, he was appointed Jipui (집의, 執義), and he was promoted as Daesaseong (대사성, 大司成) in 1426.

King Sejong the Great sent a diplomatic mission to Japan (Joseon Tongsinsa) in 1428. This embassy to court of Ashikaga Yoshinori was led by Pak Seo-saeng. Its purpose was to respond to a message sent to the Joseon court by the Japanese shogun. In 1430, he was appointed Jiphyeonjeon bujehak (집현전부제학, 集賢殿副提學). Soon after that, he became Gongjo chamui and Byeongjo chamui (참의, 參議), minister of Yukjo, the Six Ministries. In 1432, he was appointed the administrator of Andong.

After his death, Pak Seo-saeng was enshrined in the Gucheon Seowon in Uiseong, North Gyeongsang. Pak's writings are preserved in the Yaeun-eonhaengnok (야은언행록, 冶隱言行錄).

See also
 List of Joseon Dynasty people
 Joseon Tongsinsa

Notes

References

 Daehwan, Noh.  "The Eclectic Development of Neo-Confucianism and Statecraft from the 18th to the 19th Century," Korea Journal (Winter 2003).
 Kang, Etsuko Hae-jin . (1997). Diplomacy and Ideology in Japanese-Korean Relations: from the Fifteenth to the Eighteenth Century. Basingstoke, Hampshire; Macmillan. ;

External links
 Joseon Tongsinsa Cultural Exchange Association ; 

Year of birth unknown
Year of death unknown
15th-century Korean people
Korean diplomats